Jason Dawe may refer to:

Jason Dawe (presenter), motoring journalist and television show host
Jason Dawe (ice hockey) (born 1973), professional ice hockey player in the National Hockey League